Sunshine is the third studio album by New Zealand rock band Dragon, it was their first album after they had relocated to Sydney, Australia in May 1975. Sunshine was released in February 1977 by CBS Records and peaked at #24 on the Australian national albums charts. The album was certified gold. The single "This Time" had been released in late June 1976, which peaked at #26 on the Australian national singles charts. The second single "Get that Jive" was the best charting peaking at #13 and the third single "Sunshine" reached #36. The album  had US and International releases in 1978 on Portrait Records, with "This Time" called "In the Right Direction" and an alternative cover used (see infobox).

Dragon had released two progressive rock albums in New Zealand but in Sydney they were moving to a pop rock sound and sent for keyboardist Paul Hewson of rival kiwi group Mammal. Hewson joined Dragon with Marc Hunter on vocals and his older brother Todd Hunter on bass guitar, Neil Storey on drums and Robert M. Taylor on lead guitar. Storey died of heroin overdose in September 1976, aged 22. Their debut single "This Time" had begun charting, they considered disbanding but continued with ex-Mammal drummer Kerry Jacobson to complete the album. The album was dedicated to Neil Storey (1954–1976).

Background
After Dragon relocated to Sydney in May 1975 they landed a contract with CBS Records when record producer Peter Dawkins caught one of their performances. Dragon co-founder Ray Goodwin left the group in 1975, so Dragon sent for keyboard player Paul Hewson who had a reputation, in New Zealand, as a pop songwriter. Hewson, ex-Mammal, had been scouted by Dragon when they were still in New Zealand but had declined to join. Often courting or creating controversy, the band was rocked by the heroin overdose death of drummer Neil Storey in September 1976, aged 22. By then, their debut single "This Time" had begun charting. After considering disbanding, Todd Hunter consulted with former manager Graeme Nesbitt (ex-Mammal) who advised him to continue and organised for Kerry Jacobson (ex-Mammal) to join on drums.

Reception
Rip It Up noted that the song-writing in the band had matured, saying, "A few might argue that Dragon, in adopting a more commercial format, have forsaken their Art: a few more may grumble about the weaker songs on side two, but I for one see their adoption of a tried and true style as good discipline."

Track listing

Australian/New Zealand release

All songwriters according to Australasian Performing Right Association (APRA).
 "Same Old Blues" (Paul Hewson) - 4:54
 "Blacktown Boogie" (Marc Hunter, Robert M. Taylor, Todd Hunter) - 3:15
 "Sunshine" (Hewson) - 4:50
 "On the Beachead" (Taylor) - 3:59
 "This Time" (Hewson, M Hunter, Neil Storey, Taylor, T Hunter) - 3:07 ^^
 "Get that Jive" (Hewson) - 2:44
 "Street Between Your Feet" (M Hunter, Taylor) - 4:19
 "New Machine" (Hewson) - 3:47
 "MX" (M Hunter, Taylor) - 3:28
 "The Letter" (M Hunter, Taylor) - 4:09

International release
 "Same Old Blues" (Hewson) - 4:54
 "Blacktown Boogie" (M Hunter, Taylor, T Hunter) - 3:15
 "Sunshine" (Hewson) - 4:50
 "On the Beachead" (Taylor) - 3:59
 "In the Right Direction" (Hewson, M Hunter, Storey, Taylor, T Hunter) - 3:07 ^^
 "Get that Jive" (Hewson) - 2:44
 "Street Between Your Feet" (M Hunter, Taylor) - 4:19
 "New Machine" (Hewson) - 3:47
 "MX" (M Hunter, Taylor) - 3:28
 "The Letter" (M Hunter, Taylor) - 4:09

(^^) "This Time" was renamed "In the Right Direction" for International release but is otherwise the same.

Charts

Certifications

Personnel
Credited to:

Dragon
Paul Hewson – keyboards
Marc Hunter – lead vocals
Todd Hunter – bass guitar
Kerry Jacobson – drums (except "This Time")
Neil Storey – drums on "This Time"
Robert M. Taylor – guitars (electric, acoustic)

Additional musicians
Tony Buchanan – tenor saxophone on "Sunshine"
William Motzing – brass arranger

Recording
Producer – Peter Dawkins
Engineer – Bruce Brown @ Albert Studio
Additional engineering – Wyn Wynard
Manager – Sebastian Chase

Artwork
Art Direction & Design – J. Peter Thoeming
International release, Illustrator – Julia van Henneside
International release, Design – Nancy Donald, Tim Stocke
International release, Inner sleeve logo – Andy Capel
Cover Photography – Carroll Holloway

References

1977 albums
Dragon (band) albums
CBS Records albums
Portrait Records albums
Rock albums by New Zealand artists
Albums produced by Peter Dawkins (musician)